Tom Huck, also spelled Hück, (born 1971), is an American printmaker best known for his large-scale satirical woodcuts. He lives and works in St. Louis, Missouri, where he runs his own press, Evil Prints. He is a regular contributor to BLAB! of Fantagraphics Books. His work is influenced by Albrecht Dürer, José Guadalupe Posada, R. Crumb, and Honoré Daumier. Huck's illustrations have appeared in publications such as The Village Voice, The Riverfront Times, and the Minneapolis City Pages.

Huck's woodcut prints are included in numerous public and private collections, including the Metropolitan Museum of Art, Whitney Museum of American Art, Library of Congress, Spencer Museum of Art, Nelson Atkins Museum of Art, Saint Louis Art Museum, Milwaukee Art Museum, Minneapolis Institute of Art, Art Institute of Chicago, Fogg Art Museum, Michael C. Carlos Museum, and New York Public Library. Huck has been represented by David Krut Art Projects in New York, Sherry Leedy Contemporary Art in Kansas City, Missouri, Duane Reed Gallery in St. Louis, Missouri, and Eli Ridgway Gallery in San Francisco.  Beginning in October 2017 Huck's gallery representation is C. G. Boerner in New York.

In September 2011 Huck was awarded a Pollock-Krasner Foundation grant. 

 

Biography

Tom Huck was born on December 9, 1971 in Farmington, Missouri and grew up in nearby Potosi. He received a BFA in drawing from Southern Illinois University at Carbondale in 1993 and an MFA in printmaking from Washington University in 1995. From 2000 to 2010 he was an instructor in printmaking at Washington University.

Work

Huck is best known for creating large-scale woodcuts acting as both satirical narratives and social criticism. He says in his artist statement: "My work deals with personal observations about the experiences of living in a small town in southeast Missouri. The often Strange and Humorous occurrences, places, and people in these towns offer a never-ending source of inspiration for my prints. I call this work 'rural satire'".

From 1995 to 2005, Huck created two woodcut folios: 2 Weeks in August: 14 Rural Absurdities and The Bloody Bucket. 2 Weeks in August: 14 Rural Absurdities, a thematically unified suite of 14 large woodcut prints, depicted 14 bizarre folk tales that allegedly occurred in Huck's hometown of Potosi, Missouri. The suite was produced in three years from 1995 to 1998. His second body of work, The Bloody Bucket, was based on violent legends surrounding a bar of that name in or around his hometown of Potosi. It comprises 10 large-scale woodcuts, executed between 1999 and 2005.

In December 1999, Huck's work represented the United States in an exhibition entitled From Kandinsky To Corneille: Linoleum in the Art of the 20th Century held at the Cobra Museum in Amstelveen, Holland.  Featured in the exhibition was a large scale linoleum cut by Huck entitled "Attack of the 50ft. Yard Ornament".  The piece was commissioned specifically for the exhibition by the linoleum company Forbo-Krommenie in Amsterdam.

The Whitney Museum of American Art in September 2003 featured two works by Huck in an exhibition entitled To Be Human. Both the works featured were woodcuts from the series 2 Weeks in August.

Huck is currently working on a 14-triptych cycle of woodcut prints entitled Booger Stew. The first installment of the series, a triptych entitled "The Transformation of Brandy Baghead Pts. 1, 2, & 3", was completed in March 2009. An exhibition entitled Tom Huck and the Rebellious Tradition of Printmaking opened on August 28, 2009 at the Saint Louis Art Museum. Prints by Albrecht Dürer, William Hogarth, Jose Guadalupe Posada, and Max Beckmann were featured alongside Huck's "The Transformation of Brandy Baghead Pts. 1, 2, & 3".

On December 19, 2011, Huck's website www.evilprints.com announced the April 1, 2012, release of The Hillbilly Kama Sutra. This new suite of 15 linoleum cut prints is Huck's first portfolio of prints since 1998's 2 Weeks in August: 14 Rural Absurdities. On April 12, 2012, a selection of prints from the new series were released in the St. Louis weekly publication The Riverfront Times.  On May 4, 2012, Sherry Leedy Contemporary Art in Kansas City, Missouri, hosted the debut exhibition of The Hillbilly Kama Sutra.

In February 2013, Huck illustrated a cover story entitled "The 10 Weirdest Members of Congress" written by Caleb Hannan. The feature article appeared in The Riverfront Times and four other Voice Media Group publications: the Houston Press, Dallas Observer, Broward-Palm Beach New Times, and Minneapolis City Pages.  All five had a cover caricature of Michele Bachmann's head on a snake, referencing the "Don't Tread On Me" motif. The story featured 9 politicians in caricature.

In early spring of 2014 Huck completed work on his second major woodcut triptych from "Booger Stew" entitled "The Tommy Peeperz".  "The Tommy Peeperz" debuted in a show of The Outlaw Printmakers entitled "The Dirty Dozen" at the Rochester Contemporary Art Center on April 3, 2014.

An exhibition entitled "Tom Huck: Hopeless Americana" opened on October 17, 2015 at Gallery 210 at the University of Missouri-St. Louis.  Accompanying this 20 year retrospective was a catalogue that included essays by Richard Field, emeritus curator at the Yale University Gallery of Art. The exhibition included most of Huck's major works in print from 1995 to 2015, as well as sketchbooks and a small selection of studio ephemera.

In April 2017 the Library of Congress acquired “The Great War-Madillo”, a chiaroscuro woodcut made by Huck as a tribute to Dürer's Rhinoceros.

On October 27, 2017 the exhibition "Booger Stew: The Monumental Triptychs of Tom Huck" opened at the old master print dealer/gallery C. G. Boerner in New York, New York.  The show featured Huck's most recent work, a large scale chiaroscuro woodcut triptych entitled "Electric Baloneyland". Featured as well were his other large woodcuts "The Tommy Peeperz" as well as "The Transformation of Brandy Baghead".  A selection of old master prints by Hogarth, Goya, and Durer were also shown in the exhibition.

An exhibition entitled "Rival Cuts: Process & Technique in Prints By Tom Hück and Albrecht Dürer" opened on February 9, 2019 at the Michael. C. Carlos Museum at Emory University in Atlanta, GA.  The exhibition featured Hück's chiaroscuro woodcut "Electric Baloneyland" and prints from "Two Weeks in August", alongside prints by Albrecht Dürer from the "Apocalypse" series.  

The July/August 2019 issue of Penthouse magazine featured an interview with Hück.  Interviewed by Seth Ferranti, the article covers Hück discussing the inspiration for many of his works, including his many art historical influences. 

In December 2020 St. Louis art collectors Ted and Maryanne Ellison Simmons donated their entire collection of works by Tom Huck to the Saint Louis Art Museum.  The Simmons collection of Huck's works dates to 1995 and includes blocks, prints, preparatory drawings, and sketchbooks.  With the museum's previous holdings, this is the definitive archive for Huck's work.

Public works
Lambert International Airport in St. Louis, Missouri installed a large scale glass triptych by Huck in April 2012.  Entitled  “Vivere Est Volare”’ (To Live Is To Fly), the piece was the first public art project undertaken by Huck.  The piece was produced in collaboration with stained glass manufacturer Franz Mayer & Co. in Munich, Germany.  The 3 paneled piece is installed in Concourse C at Lambert Airport.

In April 2015 Laumeier Sculpture Park in suburban St. Louis permanently installed 3 playground "spring toys" designed by Huck and fabricated based on his series of "Death Bug" prints.  It is the first interactive public art project Huck had undertaken.

Commercial work
Aside from creating woodcuts, Huck has also designed logos, posters, and apparel for musicians and organizations.  Huck has created the artwork on posters, t-shirts, and ephemera for bands such as Motorhead, The Roots, and A Perfect Circle among others. In 2002 he designed the cover of The Roots' album Phrenology, and in 2009 he designed the poster for the band Motörhead and their show at The Pageant in St. Louis. Other clients of Huck's have included Pabst Blue Ribbon and Art the Vote, for which he designed a billboard ad during the 2008 presidential election. In early 2015, Huck began collaborating with the music merchandise company Global Merchandising, working on apparel and exclusive merchandise projects for Motorhead. The first of these special projects was a limited edition t-shirt design entitled "Motorhead America", based on an earlier unused tour backdrop Huck designed with input from band frontman Lemmy.
Spring 2017 saw the first release from a planned 3 part, limited edition poster series "Motorhead: By Land, Air, and Sea". This series was available exclusively through the band's official website imotorhead.com.

Style and influences

Huck's work pushes the boundaries of technique and taste in his chosen medium, the woodcut. Huck draws his influences mainly from Northern Renaissance masters, such as Albrecht Dürer whom he cites as a "print hero". Other influences include José Guadalupe Posada, Honoré Daumier, and Francisco José de Goya y Lucientes.
Huck's work is also known for his delicate and intricate method of carving and use of cross-hatching in the print medium. It has been described as having "a real delicacy of touch" and "an extraordinary landscape of marks".

Huck is associated with a movement within contemporary American printmaking known as the "Outlaw Printmakers", a group that also includes Bill Fick, Richard Mock, Dennis Mcnett, Sue Coe, Sean Starwars, Carlos Hernandez, and Canonball Press.

References

External links
 Evil Prints Official Site
 "Heavy Metal Meets Heironymous Bosch-NPR Interview 2016"
 "Tom Huck's "Bugs" at Laumeier Sculpture Park"
 "Brutal Truth" exhibition at SLUMA, 2011.
 "Tom Huck and the Rebellions Tradition of Printmaking", River Front Times, Sept. 19th, 2009
 Interview with St. Louis Magazine "First Stop: Tom Huck at SLUMA"
 Review of "Tom Huck and the Rebellious Tradition of Printmaking"
 

1971 births
Living people
American printmakers
Modern printmakers
Southern Illinois University Carbondale alumni
American illustrators
People from Farmington, Missouri
People from Potosi, Missouri